The Monte Ceneri Rail Tunnel is a railway tunnel in the Swiss canton of Ticino. The tunnel is situated under the Monte Ceneri Pass that separates the north of the canton around Bellinzona from the south of the canton around Lugano. It forms part of the Swiss Federal Railways Gotthard line, between  Giubiasco and Rivera-Bironico stations. The tunnel comprises two bores, built at different times. Both bores carry a single standard gauge track electrified at 15 kV AC 16 2/3 Hz using overhead catenary.

The rail tunnel is paralleled by the Monte Ceneri Road Tunnel, carrying the A2 motorway under the same pass. The Ceneri Base Tunnel has recently been completed beneath the pass at a much lower level.

References 

Transport in Ticino
Railway tunnels in Switzerland